On Parade is a Canadian television variety series. It ran one season.<ref>Terrace, Vincent. Encyclopedia of Television Shows, 1925 through 2007 (Jefferson, North Carolina: McFarland & Co., 2008), p.1129.</ref>
The episodes were produced for and first shown on CBC TV in Canada. Each centered on a performance by the episode's host. These were: Rosemary Clooney (17 July), Tony Bennett (24 July), Henry Mancini (31 July), Mimi Hines (7 August), Juliet Prowse (14 August), Diahann Carroll (21 August), Julius La Rosa (28 August), Jane Morgan (4 September), and The Limelighters (15 September).

The show's music was provided by Nelson Riddle's orchestra.On Parade served as a summer replacement on NBC.<ref>Vincent, p.1129.</refdoekdodkdmkdllele>

 Notes 

 Sources 
Terrace, Vincent. "On Parade" in Encyclopedia of Television Shows, 1925 through 2007''. Jefferson, North Carolina: McFarland & Co., 2008.

1964 Canadian television series debuts
1964 American television series debuts
1964 Canadian television series endings
1964 American television series endings
English-language television shows
CBC Television original programming
NBC original programming
1960s Canadian music television series
1960s Canadian variety television series